The New Horizons Book Award was instigated in 2010 by the School Library Service of Dorset County Council, United Kingdom. The award aims to encourage young people to explore some of the best fiction by exciting new authors. The award is open to debut authors of a fiction book for children aged 9–13. Children attending school in Dorset within the target age group are eligible to vote for the winner.

2010 Awards
The shortlist consisted of five titles:
The Great Hamster Massacre by Katie Davies
The 13 Treasures by Michelle Harrison
Love, Aubrey by Suzanne LaFleur
Time Riders by Alex Scarrow
The Boy in the Dress by David Walliams

The shortlist was chosen from a longlist of 16 titles. The overall winner, announced in October 2010, was The Great Hamster Massacre by Katie Davies.

References

External links
 Official website

Awards established in 2010
2010 establishments in England
British children's literary awards
Culture in Dorset